Northspur is an unincorporated community in Mendocino County, California.

A post office operated at Northspur from 1910 to 1922.

References

Unincorporated communities in California
Unincorporated communities in Mendocino County, California